The Self Starter is a 1926 American silent comedy film directed by Harry Joe Brown and starring Reed Howes, Mildred Harris and  Sheldon Lewis. It was distributed by the independent Rayart Pictures.

Synopsis
Returning from service in World War I  Jerry Neale invents a new self starting ignition system that can power tanks and tractors. He falls in love with young actress Ruth Atkin, but faces a rival in Dan Hicks who also tries to steal his invention.

Cast
 Reed Howes as 	Jerry Neale
 Mildred Harris as Ruth Atkin	
 Sheldon Lewis as Buddy
 John Sinclair as Soly
 Harry Tenbrook as Dan Hicks
 Lionel Belmore as Crane

References

Bibliography
 Connelly, Robert B. The Silents: Silent Feature Films, 1910-36, Volume 40, Issue 2. December Press, 1998.
 Munden, Kenneth White. The American Film Institute Catalog of Motion Pictures Produced in the United States, Part 1. University of California Press, 1997.

External links
 

1926 films
1926 comedy films
1920s English-language films
American silent feature films
Silent American comedy films
American black-and-white films
Films directed by Harry Joe Brown
Rayart Pictures films
1920s American films